Doncourt-lès-Conflans is a commune in the Meurthe-et-Moselle department in north-eastern France. It is the location of the Doncourt-lès-Conflans Airport, a general aviation facility.

Geography

Climate

Doncourt-lès-Conflans has a oceanic climate (Köppen climate classification Cfb).

See also
Communes of the Meurthe-et-Moselle department

References

Doncourtlesconflans